Robert Arthur Chase (born January 6, 1923) is an American surgeon, researcher and educator. He is considered to be a pioneer in the field of surgery of the hand and of plastic and reconstructive surgery.

Early life and education
Robert A. Chase obtained a Bachelor of Science from the University of New Hampshire in 1945. Due to war-time acceleration, he was able to earn an M.D. from Yale University in 1947.

Early career
After military service in the US Army during World War II, residency training in surgery at Yale University, and plastic and reconstructive surgery at the University of Pittsburgh, Chase joined the faculty at Yale University to establish Yale's first plastic surgery section. In 1963, he was appointed Professor and Chairman of Surgery at the Stanford University School of Medicine and was named the first Emile Holman Professor of Surgery. Upon his appointment, Dr. Chase was instrumental in the creation and foundation of an integrated general and plastic surgery program at Stanford. This program led to many schools around the nation adopting a similar model, as well as the creation of the Plastic & Reconstructive Surgery Division at Stanford University.

Later life
In 1973, Robert A. Chase took an additional role as Acting Chairman of the Department of Anatomy at Stanford University. From 1974 to 1977, Dr. Chase served as President and Director of the National Board of Medical Examiners in Philadelphia.

In 1977, Dr. Chase returned to surgery at Stanford University and assumed the position of Chief of the Division of Human Anatomy until 1992. In 1988, he became Professor of Surgery, Emeritus, and remained active in teaching human anatomy.

Dr. Chase has had a long-standing interest in visual aspects of education. He received the Francis Gilman Blake Award at Yale University and eight teaching awards at Stanford University. His publications include 115 papers and 35 books or chapters.

Personal life
Dr. Chase married his wife, Ann, and had three children, nine grandchildren, and 15 great grandchildren. His wife, Ann, died in October 2013. On February 14, 2015, he pledged an enduring relationship to Elizabeth Morgan Repplier, an earlier friend of the Chase family. He lived with her in Spruce Head, Maine and in Key Largo, Florida before moving to an assisted living facility in Grassvalley, California. They are in close touch with one another daily.

References

External links
 Robert A. Chase - Legacy of a Modern Hand Surgeon
 Stanford Plastic Surgery Stanford Plastic & Reconstructive Surgery
 Robert A. Chase Hand and Upper Limb Center
 Early Pioneers, Hand Surgery

1923 births
Living people
American plastic surgeons
People from Keene, New Hampshire
Stanford University School of Medicine faculty
University of New Hampshire alumni
Yale School of Medicine alumni
United States Army personnel of World War II
Members of the National Academy of Medicine